International House is the second largest residential college of the University of Melbourne. It provides co-educational accommodation to 350 undergraduate and graduate students who are attending the University of Melbourne and nearby tertiary institutions. It is situated at 241 Royal Parade, Parkville.

The college was opened in 1957 and is still owned by the University of Melbourne. It was the first International House in Australia.

History

Colombo Plan

Shortly after the end of World War II, the Australian government invited university students from countries in South and South East Asia to study in Australia as part of an aid program called the Colombo Plan. A significant number of these Colombo Plan students came to the University of Melbourne.

Various groups within and outside the University of Melbourne hoped to make these students feel welcome and assist them to form friendships with Australian students. At the same time, racial misconceptions were profoundly impacting international students looking for suitable accommodation. It was felt that the establishment of a new residential college for local and overseas students would develop interpersonal relationships between students and help increase ties between nations.

Fundraising and establishment

The model of this new residential college was inspired by the International Houses Worldwide Movement, and International Houses which were already operating successfully in Europe and the United States.

Fundraising by the student community and various community and women's groups began in the early 1950s, and enjoyed a remarkably wide base of community support. The Rotary Club of Melbourne was heavily involved in establishing International House. This involvement has continued to the present.

It was the first International House to be built in Australia, and a lot of supporters took pleasure out of building the college for this purpose. The original designated site for International House was at 231–241 Royal Parade and was purchased in September 1953 for £13,500. Its primary attractiveness was that it was away from the University of Melbourne ‘College Crescent’ and the Parkville campus, allowing residents to spend more time ‘at home’ than at university.

The Clunies Ross Wing was the first building to be established at International House, and the college opened in 1957 for its first intake of forty-two men from Australia and overseas as an independent, multicultural, self-supporting residential college owned and operated by the University of Melbourne. It was officially opened the following year by the Prime Minister of Australia of the day, the Right Honorable Sir Robert Menzies.

Admission of women

In 1972 International House became the first residential college of the University of Melbourne to admit female residents. While the idea was firmly part of its establishment proposal, upon opening the college, the International House Council favoured a conservative position, fearing the inclusion of women would call into question the moral tone of the college.

Despite attempts by various people in later years to admit women to International House, the matter was laid to rest until June 1971 when the International House Council readdressed the matter and agreed unanimously that International House admit women the following year. An equal gender balance was sought, and in 1972 women moved into the College, albeit on separate female-only floors. In later years mixed floors became the norm.

Arms

The college arms are a blue and yellow shield containing three migratory birds in the lower segment, symbolising the distance the students travel to live at International House. The image of a goddess, derived from the University of Melbourne's coat of arms, watches over these birds protectively, while offering an olive branch of peace.

Motto

Underneath the shield is the Latin word Fraternitas, which means "brotherhood".

Buildings

Clunies Ross Wing
The Clunies Ross Wing, commonly known as ‘Clunies’, was the first accommodation building established by International House. It was named after Sir Ian Clunies Ross, the first chair of the International House Council. Clunies Ross was the Chair of Rotary International's Service Committee at the time, and also a former Deputy Chancellor of the University of Melbourne. Clunies is the building where freshers can expect to stay in their first year at the college.

Clunies is adjoined to the nearby Dimmick Dining Hall (DDH). Its construction began in 1956 and was formally opened on 24 May 1958 by the then Prime Minister Sir Robert Menzies.

Wadham Wing
The Wadham Wing was named after Sir Samuel Wadham, the second Chair of the International House Council. It was opened by (Lord) Richard Casey on 23 March 1963.

Scheps Building
The Scheps Building is a sixteen-sided, six-storey residence located at 207–215 Royal Parade. The land upon which the Scheps Building is built was acquired by International House in 1965, although the building was not completed and opened until 1972, the same year that women were admitted to the college.

Hilda Stevenson Building
The Hilda Stevenson Building is located on Leonard Street in Parkville. It was purchased by International House in 1966 and was initially called the ‘Rudd Stevenson’ building before it was renamed after Dame Hilda Stevenson, who had been a generous benefactor to International House. Its acquisition  allowed International House to expand the Dimmick Dining Hall northwards. This project was completed in 1970 after a fire destroyed the roof of the old dining hall.

Originally built for the Scottish stained glass merchant James Ferguson in 1886, the building had belonged to the Victorian Children's Aid Society Home before it was acquired by International House. Its elegant Gothic Revival architecture is interlaced with beautiful stained glass windows on the north and southern ends.

Grey Court
Originally built as a school (Carlton College) in 1881, Grey court was acquired by International House in 1975. It was purchased from the Royal Melbourne Hospital, which had been using the building as nurses’ quarters.

The acquisition of Grey court was a pivotal moment in the development of International House. The College's enrolment numbers jumped to 245 students that year (1975), which placed International House as the second largest of the University of Melbourne residential colleges, behind Ormond College.

The Bob Fels Apartments
The Bob Fels Apartments are located at 16–20 The Avenue, Parkville and consist of 14 apartments. The Apartments were acquired by International House in 1996 and were formerly known as ‘The Avenue Apartments’ until they were renamed after Mr Robert Fels, a former Warden of International House from 1982 to 1997.

Dimmick Apartments
The Dimmick apartments are two flats adjoined to the back of the Dimmick Dining Hall above the kitchens, and were opened in 1998.

Founders Building
Opened in February 2005, the Founders Building houses student apartments and the Angus Mitchell Library. The Founders Building was named in honour of the various groups and individuals who conceived the idea of establishing an International House in Melbourne and for those with a driving conviction and strong commitment that made it a reality. It is built on the site of the old International House squash courts, which existed at the site from 1969 to 2003.

Ida Scheps Wing (now the George Hicks Building)
Formerly known as the Ida Scheps Wing, the terrace house located at 19 –205 Royal Parade houses tutorial rooms and other informal study spaces. It was acquired by International House from the University of Melbourne in 1964. Until December 2014, it was named for the wife of Theodore Alexander Scheps, who gave a sizeable donation to help secure the building for International House.

George Hicks Building
The George Hicks Building was opened in January 2015 with the need to provide for graduate student accommodation. Planning began in 2009 and construction began on 14 August 2013 on the site of the former multi-purpose court, which was relocated to the north-east corner of International House. It incorporates the former Ida Scheps Wing at 197 Royal Parade and provides 57 apartments, academic facilities and a café for use by the college community.

Heads of College

Student life

International House has capacity for 283 undergraduate students, 56 graduate students and 17 residential academic staff. Over half the students are international, from 39 countries around the world. It consists of nine residential buildings with associated dining, educational and recreational facilities located within 1.5 hectares of gardens.

All International House students are a part of the International House Student Club. This committee of this student club runs most of the activities that take place at the college.

Diversity 

International House has always placed a strong emphasis on diversity within the student population. The largest single national group is Australian students who form 33–40% of the population. International students living at the college are from around 39 different countries around the world. Approximately equal numbers of males and females studying a range of courses are accepted.

Angus Mitchell Library 

International House provides supplementary tutorials for its residents in over 50 different university subjects. The tutorial program is run by a team of residential tutors, who live in residence at the College and are easily accessible for consultations. In addition to providing academic support, the tutors are also responsible for providing emotional and pastoral care to the residents.

The Angus Mitchell Library was named after the president of Rotary International (1948–1949) and is housed in the Founders Building. It has an extensive collection of volumes that have an emphasis on Australia and South East Asia, including core undergraduate textbooks. Book are available to be borrowed when semester is in session, however sharing of core textbooks is possible due to high demand.

Satadal 

Satadal is the year book produced by International House students each year. The first Satadal was published in 1959, two years after the arrival of the first residents at International House. 'Satadal' is a Sanskrit word used to suggest unity in diversity, and harmony in multiformity. It is symbolised by the lotus flower.

Sporting activities 

Sport is an important part of life at International House. Both undergraduate and graduate students participate in the University of Melbourne's Intercollegiate Sporting Program, including cricket, softball, squash, athletics, soccer, hockey, rowing, netball, AFL, volleyball, badminton, and swimming.

Thai Rural and Educational Development (TREAD) Program 

The Thai Rural and Educational Development Program (formerly the Banana Project) is a development initiative run by students at International House in association with the Population and Community Development Association (PDA) in Thailand. As part of this program, students work to improve the living conditions, education and opportunities of people living in remote village in Thailand. The project was started by International House alumnus Khun Mechai Viravaidya.

Notable alumni 

Khun Mechai Viravaidya http://www.mechaifoundation.org/
Mr Leigh Clifford
The Hon Jenny Macklin

Rotary involvement

Rotary has been a major supporter of International House since its beginning. The Rotary Club of Melbourne worked hard in the early 1950s to raise funds to establish the College. Sir Angus Mitchell, President of Rotary International, had seen the value of International Houses overseas and encouraged the idea of establishing an International House in Victoria.

Robert Fels (Warden 1982–1997) established the Royce Abbey Room in the Grey court Building, which provided a venue for Rotary meetings and ensured ongoing Rotary links. Now housed in the Hilda Stevenson Building, the room also showcases Royce Abbey's collection of memorabilia from his time as President of Rotary International from 1988 to 1989.

The Rotary clubs of Melbourne, Central Melbourne Sunrise, Altona, Gisborne, District 9800 and Rotary International have remained involved with International House through their support of Café International, fundraising, scholarships and through the donation of library and sporting equipment.

References

External links
 Official website

Residential colleges of the University of Melbourne
1957 establishments in Australia